Thabo Mofutsanyana is one of the 5 districts  of the Free State province of South Africa. The seat of Thabo Mofutsanyana is Witsieshoek. The majority of its 725 932 people speak Sesotho (2001 Census). The district code is DC19

Geography

Neighbours
Thabo Mofutsanyana is surrounded by:
 Fezile Dabi to the north (DC20)
 Gert Sibande in Mpumalanga to the north-east (DC30)
 Amajuba in Kwa-Zulu Natal to the east (DC25)
 Uthukela to the south-east (DC23)
 The kingdom of Lesotho to the south
 Mangaung Metro to the south-west
 Lejweleputswa to the west (DC18)

Local municipalities
The district contains the following local municipalities:

Demographics

The following statistics are from the 2011 census.

Gender

Ethnic group

Politics

Election results
Election results for Thabo Mofutsanyana in the 2019 South African general election. 
 Registered voters: 398 412
 Total votes: 242 241
 Voting turnout: 60.8%

References

External links
 

District municipalities of the Free State (province)
Thabo Mofutsanyana District Municipality